Round Top is a hamlet (and census-designated place) in Greene County, New York, United States. Round Top has a post office with ZIP code 12473, which opened on January 3, 1910.

References

Hamlets in Greene County, New York
Hamlets in New York (state)